Jõepera may refer to several places in Estonia:

Jõepera, Tartu County, village in Meeksi Parish, Tartu County
Jõepera, Võru County, village in Antsla Parish, Võru County